The Pearson Medal of Peace is an award given out annually by the United Nations Association in Canada to recognize an individual Canadian's "contribution to international service". Nominations are made by any Canadian for any Canadian, excluding self-nominations. The medal was first announced in 1979 and named in honour of Lester B. Pearson, Nobel Peace Prize winner and Canada's fourteenth Prime Minister. The medal was to be selected by a jury of "eminent Canadians" and awarded by the Governor-General of Canada on United Nations Day, October 24.  After the 2004 medal was awarded to Roméo Dallaire, it was not awarded again until it was revived in 2011 to honour peace activist Ernie Regehr.

Recipients of the Pearson Medal of Peace

 1979 - Paul-Émile Léger
 1980 - J. King Gordon
 1981 - E. L. M. Burns
 1982 - Hugh L. Keenleyside
 1983 - George-Henri Lévesque
 1984 - George Ignatieff
 1985 - Lois Miriam Wilson
 1986 - Meyer Brownstone
 1987 - Nancy Meek Pocock
 1988 - Edward Scott
 1989 - Maurice Strong
 1990 - Murray Thomson
 1991 - Muriel Duckworth
 1992 - Eric Hoskins
 1993 - Escott Reid
 1994 - Martin Connell
 1995 - Gisèle Côté-Harper
 1996 - Gerry Barr
 1997 - Hanna Newcombe
 1998 - Pat Roy Mooney
 1999 - Flora MacDonald
 2000 - No award made
 2001 - Ursula M. Franklin
 2002 - Alex Morrison
 2003 - Stephen Lewis
 2004 - Roméo Dallaire
 2005 - 2009 - No award made
 2010 - Ernie Regehr
 2013 - Donald S. Ethell
 2014 - Nigel Fisher
 2016 - Louise Arbour
 2017 - Lloyd Axworthy
 2018 - Willie Littlechild
 2019 - 2020 - No award made
 2021 - Beverly McLachlin
 2022 - John McGarry

See also
 List of Canadian awards

References

External links
 UNAC Pearson Medal information

Peace awards
Canadian awards
Canada and the United Nations